The vast majority of people in Tokelau are Christians and Christianity plays a significant role in the Tokelauan way of life.

History
Missionaries preached Christianity in Tokelau from 1845 to the 1860s. French Roman Catholic missionaries on Wallis Island (also known as 'Uvea) and missionaries of the Protestant London Missionary Society in Samoa used native teachers to convert the Tokelauans. Atafu was converted to Protestantism by the London Missionary Society, Nukunonu was converted to Catholicism and Fakaofo was converted to both denominations. Since 1992 the Roman Catholic Mission Sui Iuris of Tokelau has represented the Catholic church in Tokelau.

Denominations
In 2006, all people who answered the religion question on the Tokelauan census gave one of the major Christian denominations as their religion.

In 2011, 58.5% of respondents belonged to the Congregational Christian denomination and over one-third of respondents (36.8%) belonged to the Roman Catholic denomination. Of the remaining 4.7%, 1.8% were Presbyterian, 0.1% belonged to Spiritual and New Age religions, and 2.8% belonged to other Christian denominations.

Variation by atoll

The majority of Tokelau's usually resident population living on Atafu (89.8%) and Fakaofo (68.9%) in 2011 were Congregational Christians. Congregational Christian has remained the major denomination on Atafu and Fakaofo since the 2006 Census, but the proportion of residents who report belonging has decreased.

In 2006, 95.4% of residents on Atafu and 70.7% on Fakaofo were Congregational Christians.

Roman Catholic has remained the major denomination of Nukunonu residents since the 2006 Census. In 2011, 93.9% of usual residents were Roman Catholics, compared with 96.9% in 2006.

Since the 2006 Census, the proportion of Congregational Christians on Nukunonu has increased markedly, from 2.1% in 2006 to 4.5% in 2011. On Atafu, the proportion of Roman Catholics also had a notable increase, from 0.2% in 2006 to 2.4% in 2011.

On Fakaofo, there was an increase in its second-largest religious denomination (Roman Catholic). In 2011, 25.9% of Fakaofo residents were Roman Catholics, compared with 22.2% in 2006.

References
This article contains content derived from the 2011 Tokelau Census, produced by Statistics New Zealand, which is licensed under the Creative Commons Attribution 3.0 New Zealand License. See  for the full citation.

 
Demographics of Tokelau